Brian Kelly McKnight (born June 5, 1969) is an American singer, songwriter, actor, record producer, radio host and multi-instrumentalist. He is most recognized for his strong head voice, high belting range and melisma.

McKnight is known for his songs from albums such as Brian McKnight (platinum debut), Anytime and Back at One. His work has earned him 16 Grammy Awards nominations, third only to Zubin Mehta and Snoop Dogg for the record of most Grammy nominations without a win.

Early life 
McKnight was born in Buffalo, New York to Claude McKnight, Jr. and Ruth Elaine Willis. His music experience began in childhood when he became a member of his church choir, which was directed by his grandfather. McKnight explored different genres of music, and in his early teens, he started musical ambitions by composing instrumental material while learning to play several instruments. McKnight formed a band and began performing his original songs at local venues. By the age of 18, he was offered a publishing deal.

Career

Mercury Records: Brian McKnight and Anytime (1990–1997) 
McKnight's older brother, Claude McKnight III (and his band Take 6), signed a record deal with Warner Brothers in 1990. This encouraged McKnight to shop his own demo tapes and by the age of 19, he signed his first recording deal with Mercury Records subsidiary, Wing Records. His self-titled debut album Brian McKnight was released in 1992, and peaked at number 58 on the Billboard 200 chart. His first release was "The Way Love Goes", which peaked at number 11 on the Billboard Top R&B/Hip-Hop Albums chart. The album also featured the ballad, and Top 20 single, "One Last Cry". It was followed by two more albums for Mercury, I Remember You (1995) and Anytime (1997). Anytime, McKnight's final album with Mercury, sold over two million copies and was nominated for a Grammy. The video for "Anytime", directed by Darren Grant, was nominated for Best Male Video at the 1998 MTV Video Music Awards. In 1997, McKnight recorded "Remember the Magic" for Walt Disney World's 25th anniversary.

Motown Records: Bethlehem and Back at One (1998–2004) 
McKnight signed with Motown in 1998 and released a Christmas album, Bethlehem, the first of five albums he released on Motown.

In 1998, McKnight was a guest star on the show Sister Sister. He appeared in multiple episodes, as Tia and Tamera's college professor.

In 1999, McKnight released Back at One, his most successful album to date, which eventually went on to sell over three million copies. Additionally, Back at One is one of four of McKnight's studio albums to reach the Top 10 on the Billboard 200 albums chart, reaching number 7 on October 9, 1999.

In 2004, McKnight co-wrote the song "Wait" with Australian soul artist Guy Sebastian, which appeared on Sebastian's Beautiful Life album.

Warner Brothers: Ten and media/radio gigs (2005–2014) 

In late 2005, McKnight signed with Warner Bros. Records and released the album Ten during December 2006. It was his only studio album with the label. Three singles were released from the album: "Find Myself in You" (which originally appeared on the soundtrack to the 2006 Tyler Perry movie Madea's Family Reunion), "Used to Be My Girl" and "What's My Name".

In October 2007, McKnight made his Broadway debut in the show Chicago.

Between 2006 and 2010, McKnight hosted The Brian McKnight Morning Show, a radio show with Pat Prescott on KTWV The Wave in Los Angeles. The show was briefly simulcast on KHJZ-FM, Smooth Jazz 95.7 The Wave in Houston, Texas. In January 2009, McKnight hosted "The Brian McKnight Show" on 98.7 KISS FM in New York City.

In 2009, McKnight appeared in the eighth season of Celebrity Apprentice. Each celebrity played to raise money for the charity of his or her choice. McKnight elected to play for Youthville USA.

Between September 2009 and May 2010, McKnight served as the media personality and hosted The Brian McKnight Show, a late night talk show billed as a combination of talk and variety which aired in syndication.

McKnight sang the National Anthem for MLB Opening Day in Cincinnati, Ohio with his sons Brian, Jr. and Niko on March 31, 2011. He had previously sung the National Anthem for the 1997 NBA All-Star Game in Cleveland, Game 6 of the 2002 World Series in Anaheim, California (near his Los Angeles home), and the 2005 Major League Baseball All-Star Game in Detroit. He has also made numerous other "National Anthem" appearances throughout his career. Additionally, McKnight sang "God Bless America" in the 7th inning of Game 7 of the National League Champion Series in San Francisco on October 22, 2012.

On April 23, 2012, McKnight posted to YouTube "If You're Ready To Learn", which has been characterized by Billboard as a "filthy jam". Billboard selected this lyric from the work to quote: "Let me show you how your p—y works / Since you didn't bring it to me first." Other media outlets such as MTV, the Toronto Sun, and NewMediaRockstars have also written about McKnight's recent, more adult-oriented efforts. Shortly after the single's release, McKnight and Funny or Die revealed that the single was a collaboration between the two. McKnight later explained that he wrote the parody as a commentary on the state of R&B, which he noted was in a period of degradation overall with famous radio station 98.7 Kiss FM shuttering and hit singles being inferior quality music, among other ailments.

Brian McKnight Music and Kobalt: Better (2015–2016) 
On August 14, 2015, McKnight released the single "Uh Oh Feeling", the first track from his album Better. It was released on his own label, Brian McKnight Music LLC via Kobalt Label Services. Better was released on February 26, 2016. The album received positive reviews.

SoNo Recording: An Evening with... and Genesis (2016–present) 
On September 23, 2016 (twenty years from the date of his studio album Anytime), McKnight released his first live CD, DVD and Blu-ray collection entitled An Evening with Brian McKnight (in partnership with independent recording label, SoNo Recording Group, via the Universal Music Group). The concert was recorded in Los Angeles, at the historic Saban Theatre. The release includes fourteen songs performed live with his full band, plus three newly written and recorded songs. The first single, "Everything", reached the Top 20 on the national Adult Contemporary charts in September 2016. The CD version of the concert debuted on the Billboard R&B chart at number 13, as a Hot Shot Debut. Also included, is a duet with Gino Vannelli, on the song "Brothers in the End". The Blu-ray and DVD version of the release premiered on the Billboard Music DVD chart at number 9.

McKnight released the album Genesis on August 25, 2017. It featured three Top 30 Urban AC and AC hits: "Everything", "Forever" and "I Want U". Genesis premiered on the Nielsen SoundScan Top 10 Current R&B Albums and Top 20 Current Hip Hop/R&B Albums. The album was produced by Tim Kelley, part of the legendary duo Tim & Bob.

In January 2018, McKnight was nominated for two NAACP Image Awards. He was nominated for Outstanding Male Artist and Outstanding Album for Genesis (alongside Bruno Mars, Charlie Wilson, Kendrick Lamar, Jay-Z and Mary J Blige).

In May 2018, McKnight announced he was working on his next studio album tentatively titled Bedtime Story, which would be 60 minutes of music "for the bedroom aka baby-making music".

In 2021, Brian McKnight competed on The Masked Singer spin-off The Masked Dancer as "Cricket".

Personal life 
McKnight was married in 1990 to singer-songwriter and his college sweetheart, Julie McKnight. They have two children, Brian Jr.,  and Niko. They divorced in 2003. McKnight also has a daughter named Brianna and another son, Clyde, from previous relationships.

In 2014, he began dating Dr. Leilani Malia Mendoza, and they announced their engagement in May 2017. On December 29, 2017, McKnight and Mendoza were married. Mendoza has two children from a previous relationship, Julia and Jack; McKnight and Mendoza had a son who died in infancy. In January 2023, McKnight and Mendoza welcomed another son.

Religion 
Brian McKnight was raised a Seventh-day Adventist. Religion was important in the McKnight family, with many generations being Seventh-day Adventists. His grandfather was a pastor of a church, and his mother played the piano and sang in a gospel choir in Buffalo's Emanuel Temple. Being the youngest of four boys, McKnight became a member of an a cappella gospel quartet with his brothers. He also attended Oakwood College, a Seventh-day Adventist university in Huntsville, Alabama, from 1987 to 1989. In his second year, McKnight got into trouble for violating Oakwood's rules about dormitory visitors for having his girlfriend in his dorm room. They were both expelled.

Discography 

Studio albums

 Brian McKnight (1992)
 I Remember You (1995)
 Anytime (1997)
 Bethlehem (1998)
 Back at One (1999)
 Superhero (2001)
 U Turn (2003)
 Gemini (2005)

 Ten (2006)
 Evolution of a Man (2009)
 Just Me (2011)
 More Than Words (2013)
 Better (2016)
 Genesis (2017)
 Exodus (2020)

Filmography

Television

Film

Awards and nominations

References

External links 

 Brian McKnight official website
 Brian McKnight entertainment website
 Brian McKnight's Biography from VH1
 Brian McKnight's Profile from VIBE
 Brian McKnight Fans Website
 Blogs.OrlandoSentinel.com
 Brian McKnight JUST ME 2011 World Tour
 Music.Yahoo.com  

American soul guitarists
American tenors
American contemporary R&B singers
Record producers from New York (state)
American male trumpeters
American male guitarists
African-American guitarists
American multi-instrumentalists
Ballad musicians
Motown artists
Warner Music Group artists
Musicians from Buffalo, New York
1969 births
Living people
20th-century American keyboardists
African-American record producers
African-American male singer-songwriters
Participants in American reality television series
Singer-songwriters from New York (state)
Guitarists from New York (state)
20th-century American guitarists
20th-century American pianists
21st-century trumpeters
American male pianists
21st-century American pianists
The Apprentice (franchise) contestants
African-American pianists
20th-century African-American male singers
21st-century African-American male singers